Héctor Rodríguez (born 2 April 1936) is a Colombian equestrian. He competed in the individual dressage event at the 1988 Summer Olympics.

References

External links
 

1936 births
Living people
Colombian male equestrians
Colombian dressage riders
Olympic equestrians of Colombia
Equestrians at the 1988 Summer Olympics
Place of birth missing (living people)
Equestrians at the 1971 Pan American Games
Pan American Games bronze medalists for Colombia
Pan American Games medalists in equestrian
Medalists at the 1971 Pan American Games
20th-century Colombian people
21st-century Colombian people